HD 56405 is a star in the southern constellation of Canis Major. It is white in hue and is dimly visible to the naked eye with an apparent visual magnitude of 5.45. To the east of HD 56405 is the open cluster NGC 2360, also known as Caroline's Cluster. The distance to HD 56405, as determined from parallax measurements, is approximately 249 light years. It is drifting further away with a radial velocity (RV) of about +6 km/s. Although classed as a single star, it is to suspected to vary in RV.

This is an A-type main-sequence star with a stellar classification of A1V. It was classed as a candidate Lambda Boötis star, but as of 2015 this classification has been rejected by astronomers due to the star having an inconsistent UV flux, possible RV variability, and a fairly high rotation rate. The star is about 212 million years old with 2.13 times the mass of the Sun and is spinning with a projected rotational velocity of 149 km/s. It is radiating 39 times the luminosity of the Sun from its photosphere at an effective temperature of around 9,562 K.

References

A-type main-sequence stars
Canis Major
Durchmusterung objects
056405
035180
2758
Gliese and GJ objects